Waldemar Lindgren (February 14, 1860 – November 3, 1939) was a Swedish-American geologist and a founder of modern economic geology.

Life
Lindgren was born in Vassmolösa, Kalmar Municipality, Småland, Sweden, the son of Johan and Emma Lindgren. Johan was a judge and member of parliament, Emma the daughter of a clergyman. He attended the Freiberg Mining Academy, Germany, graduating as a mining engineer in 1882.

In 1884, Lindgren began a 31-year career with the U.S. Geological Survey, working on ore deposits in the Rocky Mountains. In 1905, he helped found the journal Economic Geology. In 1912, he was appointed head of the Department of Geology at the Massachusetts Institute of Technology.

Lindgren was elected a foreign member of the Royal Swedish Academy of Sciences in 1931. 
He was a fellow of the Mineralogical Society of America. He was president of the Geological Society of America in 1924 (winning its Penrose Medal in 1933) and of the Society of Economic Geologists (winning its Penrose Gold Medal in 1928).

Lindgren's published writings run to nearly 200 titles, not counting discussions, reviews, and more than 1,000 abstracts. Most are on the great ore deposits. Editions of Mineral Deposits, his widely used textbook, were published in 1913, 1919, 1928 and 1933.

Lingdren died in 1939 in Brighton, Boston.

Publications
The Gold Belt of the Blue Mountains of Oregon Extract from the 22nd Annual Report (1900-1901) Part 2: Ore Deposits (U.S. Geological Survey. 1902. pages 553–776)
 The water resources of Molokai, Hawaiian Islands (US Geological Survey Water-Supply Paper No. 77. 1903. 62 pages)
The copper deposits of the Clifton-Morenci district, Arizona (US Geological Survey Professional Paper No. 43. 1905. 375 pages)
 Geology and gold deposits of the Cripple Creek District, Colorado. (Lindgren, W., & Ransome, F. L. US Geological Survey Professional Paper No. 54. 1906. 516 pages)
 The ore deposits of New Mexico (Lindgren, W., Graton, L. C., Schrader, F. C., & Hill, J. M. US Geological Survey Professional Paper No. 68 1910. 361 pages)
 The Tertiary Gravels of the Sierra Nevada of California (US Geological Survey Professional Paper No. 73. 1911. 226 pages)
 Mineral Deposits (New York, McGraw-Hill. 1913)

References

External links 

 
Memorial from American Mineralogist 
 Brief bio, National Mining Hall of Fame
 Biographical sketch from Dictionary of American Biography
 , from SEG Newsletter, accessed 1/17/08

1860 births
1939 deaths
People from Kalmar Municipality
American geologists
Wollaston Medal winners
Penrose Medal winners
Members of the Royal Swedish Academy of Sciences
United States Geological Survey personnel
Swedish emigrants to the United States
Economic geologists
Presidents of the Geological Society of America
Members of the United States National Academy of Sciences